Branch Building, also known as the Virginia Fire and Marine Insurance Company, is a historic commercial building located in Richmond, Virginia.  It was built about 1886, and is a four-story, four bay, brick building with a cast iron front. The building measures 26 feet wide by 140 feet deep.

It was listed on the National Register of Historic Places in 1970.

References

External links
Virginia Fire & Marine Insurance Building, 1015 East Main Street, Richmond, Independent City, VA: 4 photos, 4 measured drawings, and 7 data pages at Historic American Buildings Survey

Historic American Buildings Survey in Virginia
Commercial buildings on the National Register of Historic Places in Virginia
Cast-iron architecture in Virginia
Commercial buildings completed in 1886
Buildings and structures in Richmond, Virginia
National Register of Historic Places in Richmond, Virginia